The Claro River is a river of Chile located in the Maule Region. It rises in the Andes, in the Radal Siete Tazas National Park and flows northwest until the city of Molina. Then, it flows southwest, crosses below the Panamericana, to the vicinity of the city of Talca to empty into the Maule River. In this last portion of its course, the river receives the waters of the tributary Lircay River.

See also
List of rivers of Chile

References

Rivers of Chile
Rivers of Maule Region